Several Canadian naval units have been named HMCS Regina.

  (I) was a Flower-class corvette that served in the Royal Canadian Navy during the Second World War.
  (II) is a  that serves in the Canadian Forces.

Battle honours
Atlantic, 1942–44
Gulf of St. Lawrence, 1942, 1944.
Mediterranean, 1943.
English Channel, 1944.
Normandy, 1944.
Arabian Sea

References

Canadian Forces: Directory of History and Heritage - HMCS Regina

See also
 
 

Royal Canadian Navy ship names